Acalyptris argyraspis is a moth of the family Nepticulidae. It was described by Puplesis and Diskus in 1995. It is known from Tadzhikistan.

References

Nepticulidae
Endemic fauna of Tajikistan
Moths of Asia
Moths described in 1995